Michael "Al" Morganti is an American journalist, who has covered the National Hockey League (NHL) and international competitions. He is currently a pre- and post-game analyst for the Philadelphia Flyers of the NHL for games broadcast on NBC Sports Philadelphia. He is also a radio personality for 94.1 WIP in Philadelphia.

Early life and education
Originally from Boston, Morganti grew up as a fan of the Boston Bruins. He did not intend to work in journalism until his later years in college. He graduated from the Boston University College of Communication in 1978 with a bachelor's of science. While in college, Morganti started his journalism career writing for The Boston Globe covering high school and college hockey.

Journalism career

Early career
Morganti's first full-time job in sports journalism came with the Ft. Lauderdale News where he covered the Miami Dolphins. Having a love for hockey, Morganti then joined The Atlanta Constitution in 1979 as a hockey beat writer covering the Atlanta Flames. After five months at The Atlanta Constitution, Morganti served as the Flyers beat writer for The Philadelphia Inquirer from 1979 to 1989. In 1988, Morganti joined The Hockey News as a writer and also wrote a column in the Daily Local News three days a week.

Radio career at WIP
From 1993 until 2023, Morganti was a sports radio personality for the 94.1 WIP Morning Show in Philadelphia along with co-hosts Angelo Cataldi, Rhea Hughes, and fellow Flyers broadcast crew member Keith Jones. Following Cataldi's retirement, Morganti took a new role at WIP on the weekends.

Following Cataldi's retirement in 2023, Morganti took on a new role at WIP hosting a weekend show at WIP and a Flyer's podcast.

Television
In 1990, Morganti was part of The Great Sports Debate on PRISM. Morganti was part of a panel featuring Cataldi, Glen Macnow, Jayson Stark and later Mike Missanelli. Morganti's dog, Fenway, was also a popular part of the show.

Morganti then served as an NHL analyst for ESPN from 1993 to 2005 where he worked alongside other analysts including John Saunders on ESPN Hockey Night. Following his time at ESPN, Morganti accepted a position as a pre- and post-game analyst for Philadelphia Flyers games on Comcast SportsNet.

Recognition
In 2022, Morganti was presented with the Elmer Ferguson Memorial Award by the Hockey Hall of Fame for his journalism career.

References

American radio personalities
American television reporters and correspondents
Boston University College of Communication alumni
National Hockey League broadcasters
Writers from Boston
Writers from Philadelphia
Philadelphia Flyers announcers
The Philadelphia Inquirer people
Sportswriters from Massachusetts
Sportswriters from Pennsylvania
Living people
1953 births